The North Texas Tollway Authority (NTTA) is an organization that maintains and operates toll roads, bridges, and tunnels in the North Texas area.  Functioning as a political subdivision of the State of Texas under Chapter 366 of the Transportation Code, the NTTA is empowered to acquire, construct, maintain, repair and operate turnpike projects; to raise capital for construction projects through the issuance of turnpike revenue bonds; and to collect tolls to operate, maintain and pay debt service on those projects.

The NTTA is governed by a nine-member board of directors, two appointed by each of the four counties in its service area: Collin County, Dallas County, Denton County and Tarrant County as well as one appointed by the Texas Governor. North Texas Tollway Authority is a non-profit entity, and performs many of the same functions as the Texas Department of Transportation, but is limited solely to facilities that it operates for revenue.

Board of Directors 
There are nine members of the NTTA Board of Directors. Eight members are appointed by four counties, two per county. The ninth member is appointed by the governor. Of these members, one is elected to serve as board chairman, and another is elected to serve as vice chairman.

Current roadways

Tollways
 Dallas North Tollway
 President George Bush Turnpike
 Sam Rayburn Tollway
 Chisholm Trail Parkway
 360 Tollway

Bridges and tunnels
Addison Airport Toll Tunnel
Lewisville Lake Toll Bridge
Mountain Creek Lake Bridge

Planned roadways or expansions
Dallas North Tollway: northern extension to just north of the Grayson County line

History

Texas Turnpike Authority history
The Texas Turnpike Authority (TTA) began construction on the state's first toll road, the Dallas–Fort Worth Turnpike, in 1955 and opened the road in 1957. Original plans were for the bonds on the Turnpike to be retired in 1995; however, the bonds were retired in 1977 (17 years ahead of schedule) and tolls were then removed from the road, which the next year was officially designated as Interstate 30 (I-30).

Construction began on NTTA's oldest existing toll road, the Dallas North Tollway, in 1966, and its first segment (from I-35E to I-635) was opened in 1968. The Tollway (as it is popularly known) has (along with general Dallas-area growth) expanded continually northward, opening extensions in 1987, 1994, and most recently in 2007.

TTA started construction in 1977 on its first toll bridge, the  Mountain Creek Lake Bridge, which opened in 1979. The bridge spans Mountain Creek Lake in the southwestern Dallas County city of Grand Prairie.

Construction was started on TTA's only project outside the area, the  Jesse Jones Memorial Bridge across the Houston Ship Channel, in 1979, with the bridge opening in 1982. TTA sold the bridge to the newly created Harris County Toll Road Authority in 1994, leaving all of TTA's assets in the area in which NTTA was later established.

NTTA establishment 
The North Texas Tollway Authority (NTTA) was established in 1997 by Texas Senate Bill 370. The legislation abolished the TTA, which was an independent state agency, and established the Texas Turnpike Authority division of the Texas Department of Transportation. The bill established the NTTA and made it the successor agency to TTA, assuming the prior agencies assets and liabilities. The bill authorized the establishment of other regional tollway authorities and established the laws by which they are governed.

TollTag

TollTag is the electronic toll collection system used by the NTTA in the Dallas / Fort Worth metro area. It was North America’s first electronic toll collection system when it was installed on the Dallas North Tollway in 1989. There are currently over 4 million TollTags in operation in the North Texas area. The NTTA offers reduced toll rates for TollTag users at all toll points.

TollTags can be used on all of the roadways of the NTTA, and they can also be used on any other toll road in the state of Texas as well as for some parking lots in downtown Dallas for parking or toll payment at the Dallas/Fort Worth International Airport (DFW), and at Dallas Love Field Airport (DAL). Current TollTags are small stickers, similar to those used for state inspections and auto registrations, but cannot be moved between vehicles. The previous TollTag was a hard case tag which was affixed to the windshield using velcro tags; these tags are still valid and can be moved between vehicles, but they are not true portable devices—they must be assigned to one vehicle only and, if moved to a different vehicle, require re-registration on the TollTag account.

Interoperability
 2003 - Texas Department of Transportation (TxTag), Harris County Toll Road Authority and Fort Bend County Toll Road Authority (EZ Tag).
 August 10, 2014 - Oklahoma Turnpike Authority (Pike Pass).
 May 17, 2017 - Kansas Turnpike Authority (K-TAG).

Criticism
In August 2010, the NTTA faced criticism by replacing the only minority member of the board—making the nine-member board all white and all male.

A multi-year audit released in October 2011 stated that the NTTA had inappropriate discussions with consultants while they were in the midst of bidding on lucrative Tollway contracts, as well as not having a firmly defined code of corporate ethics.

The FBI raid of 2011 
Various DFW news outlets first started reporting that the North Texas Tollway Authority (NTTA) had been raided by Federal Bureau of Investigation (FBI) officials in late October of 2011. NBC 5 DFW (KXAS-TV) first reported this story on October 22, 2011 that "FBI Questioned NTTA Officials". Four years after that article was published, January 13, 2015, the NTTA finally released a nine-page PDF document entitled 'NTTA RUMORS Q&A' where the authority explained what exactly happened. According to the published memo:

"Beginning in October 2011, the Federal Bureau of Investigation (the "FBI") interviewed several officials of the Authority regarding any knowledge the officials may have concerning the conduct of certain current and former Board members, including possible conflicts of interests pertaining to Authority business. The Authority has no reason to believe that it is the target of the investigation or that the investigation will materially adversely affect the operations or financial condition of the Authority or the transactions contemplated by the Resolution, the Trust Agreement and this Official Statement, or would adversely affect the validity or enforceability of the Resolution, the Trust Agreement or the Series 2014 Bonds. The investigation is ongoing and the Authority is cooperating fully with the FBI. There can be no assurance that the investigation will be limited to the matters described above or that the Authority will not become a target at a later date."

Following this memo, neither any current or former board members were charged and the result, and or findings, of the FBI 'raid' are still currently unknown.

See also 
 EZ TAG
 E-ZPass used in 14 states, mostly in the East and Midwest, as well as in Ontario
 Fastrak used in California
 GeauxPass used in Louisiana
 I-Pass used in Illinois
 K-Tag used in Kansas
 NationalPass provides interoperability with TransCore systems outside of Texas
 Peach Pass used in Georgia
 Pikepass used in Oklahoma
 Sunpass used in Florida
 TxTag
 Texas tollways

References

External links
North Texas Tollway Authority

Toll road authorities of the United States
Transportation in Dallas
Toll roads in Texas